The Heldeberg Spirit 103, also called the Blue Heron Spirit 103, is an American powered parachute, designed and produced by Heldeberg Designs of Altamont, New York.

Design and development
It features a parachute-style high-wing, single-place accommodation, tricycle landing gear and originally a single  2si 460 engine in pusher configuration. The  Rotax 447 and  Rotax 503 engines are used on current models.

Early models used a large sized  parachute, whereas current models use a smaller and faster  wing.

The aircraft is built from a combination of bolted aluminium and stainless steel tubing. It features a double ring propeller guard that has been roll-over tested. The  fuel tank is made from aluminium. In flight steering is accomplished via foot pedals, or optionally a control stick, that actuate the canopy brakes, creating roll and yaw. On the ground the aircraft has lever-controlled nosewheel steering. The main landing gear incorporates gas strut suspension. The aircraft is factory supplied in the form of an assembly kit that requires 30–50 hours to complete.

Originally marketed by the factory under their own name, the aircraft is now marketed under the brand name Blue Heron, although the manufacturer remains the same.

Specifications (Blue Heron Spirit 103)

References

External links

1990s United States ultralight aircraft
Single-engined pusher aircraft
Powered parachutes